William Stumbels lived and worked as a clockmaker in Totnes, Devon, from around 1700 to 1769. Two of his clocks can be found in Totnes Museum. A 14-foot high longcase clock made by him between 1743 and 1747, for which he charged £105, can be seen in the Marble Hall of Powderham Castle.

References

Year of birth missing
Year of death missing
18th-century English people
People from Totnes
English clockmakers